George Robert "G. R." Carter, Jr. (born February 6, 1968) is a retired professional American Quarter Horse jockey.  On June 1, 2008, he became the all-time leading money-earning jockey in American Quarter Horse racing history surpassing the previous record of $41,405,207 in mount earnings.  He continued to add to the record and retired with $75,799,513 in mount earnings.  On July 6, 2013, Carter became the jockey with the most mounts in AQHA racing history after he piloted his 22,294th horse.  Carter finished his career with 25,586 mounts on American Quarter Horses.  On May 23, 2014, Carter became the all-time leader in wins aboard American Quarter Horses when he won his 3,632nd race passing Alvin "Bubba" Brossette.  His final tally was 4,001 wins.

Carter has been named the American Quarter Horse Association (AQHA) World Champion Jockey ten times in his career including six years consecutively from 2003-2008. No other jockey has won more than five titles.

Early life 
Carter has Osage heritage and grew up in Pawhuska, Oklahoma.  As a teenager, he was a competitive gymnast and won the state championship.  During his Senior year at Pawhuska High School, Carter won the Class A State Wrestling Championship at 108 pounds.  Growing up, Carter was involved in ranching and rodeos, which helped develop his love of horses.  At age 14, he began galloping race horses for a local trainer to help fund his rodeo participation.  Throughout his Senior year in high school, he would occasionally ride races on the weekends  at Blue Ribbon Downs and Eureka Downs.

Professional career 

After graduating from high school in 1986, Carter moved to Sallisaw, Oklahoma to become a full-time jockey at Blue Ribbon Downs.  He continued to ride primarily in the central part of the United States until the early 1990s when he moved his tack to Los Alamitos Race Course in Southern California.  After a couple of successful years in California, Carter moved his home base back to Oklahoma.

Carter won the All American Futurity twice, in 1998 aboard Falling In Loveagain and again in 2008 aboard Stolis Winner. In 2008, Carter set a new AQHA single-season earnings record by reaching the $5,027,173 mark in mount earnings.  This eclipsed the previous record of $4.5 million which he had also set.  Also in 2008, Carter broke his own single-meet record for wins at Remington Park in Oklahoma City, Oklahoma with a total of 98.  Also in 2008, he rode Fast Prize Zoom to a World Record for 300 yards with a final time of 14.87 seconds at Sunland Park in Sunland, New Mexico.  May 31, 2009 was declared by Governor Brad Henry as G. R. Carter Day in Oklahoma.

Carter holds the record for most wins for three different breeds of horses.  He leads the all-time standing for American Quarter Horses, American Paint Horses, and Appaloosas.  He has been named American Paint Horse Association (APHA) World Champion Jockey ten times in his career.  He is the Paint Racing all-time leader in wins as well as mount earnings.  He was the jockey for the record-setting paint horse Got Country Grip, who tied a North American racing record for any breed in 2008 by winning 16 consecutive races.

Carter was known throughout the racing world for his "back-flip" dismounts.  After winning a stakes race, he often used his gymnastics background to celebrate by performing a back-flip off of the horse from the saddle.  He also has served as the Vice Chairman on the Board of Directors of the Jockey's Guild.

Personal
Carter's wife is Shaena, and they reside in Oklahoma City, Oklahoma.  His father-in-law, Jerry Burgess,  also won the All American Futurity as a jockey in 1975 aboard Bugs Alive In 75.  In his spare time, Carter is an avid team roper.  He will occasionally enter professional rodeos, and won the Pro-Am at the 2007 World Series of Team Roping.

References
The American Quarter Horse Racing Journal Annual Review, March 2008
2008 Champions Named
Los Alamitos Jockey Profile
AQHA Racing Leaders
2007 AQHA Champion Jockey
AQHA Champions History
AQHA.com Article #1
AQHA.com Article #2
2008 Remington Park Season Wrap-Up
Got Country Grip Defeated
All American Futurity Controversy
Carter Elected to Ruidoso Downs Hall of Fame

External links 
 AQHA Racing
 Los Alamitos Race Course
 Remington Park
 Jockeys Guild

American jockeys
Living people
1968 births
Sportspeople from Oklahoma
People from Pawhuska, Oklahoma
Roping (rodeo)